Philip Jeremy Gittins (born 30 January 1956) is a British actor from Manchester, England, who is known for his role as Michael the 'dishy' Church of England vicar in the successful BBC One sitcom Keeping Up Appearances from 1990 to 1995.

Career 
Gittins has also appeared in many popular British sitcoms and leading television programmes. He has appeared in Doctor Who alongside Fourth Doctor Tom Baker and Lalla Ward, Tenko, Boon, A Touch of Frost, New Tricks, EastEnders (as John Charrington), Doctors and, more recently he has starred in Footballers' Wives in 2005.

As well as Keeping Up Appearances, he has also made appearances in several other sitcoms, namely Fresh Fields, Terry and June, Andy Capp, Blackadder Goes Forth and The Upper Hand.

Television roles

External links

Jeremy Gittins at the British Film Institute
Jeremy Gittins (Aveleyman)

1956 births
Living people
English male television actors
Male actors from Manchester
English male stage actors
20th-century English male actors
21st-century English male actors